The 2017 Pacific-Asia Curling Championships was held 2–8 November in Erina, New South Wales, Australia. The top three teams from the men's and women's tournaments qualified for the 2018 World Men's Curling Championship and 2018 Ford World Women's Curling Championship respectively. This was the first Pacific-Asia Championship where the top three teams qualify for the World Championships. Previously, only the top two teams qualified.

Men

Teams

Round Robin Standings

Playoffs

Women

Teams

Round Robin Standings

* Both teams had beaten each other in the round robin, so Hong Kong advanced to the playoffs after a draw shot challenge.

Playoffs

References

External links

Pacific-Asia Curling Championships
Pacific-Asia Curling Championships
International curling competitions hosted by Australia
Pacific-Asia Curling Championships
Pacific-Asia Curling Championships
Sport on the Central Coast (New South Wales)
2010s in New South Wales